Governor Murray may refer to:

Brian Murray (governor) (1921–1991), Governor of Victoria March 1982 - 1985
Eli Houston Murray (1843–1896), Governor of Utah Territory 1880 - 1886
George Murray (British Army officer), Governor of Edinburgh Castle and Governor of Fort George
Herbert Harley Murray (1829–1904), Scottish Colonial Governor of Newfoundland from 1895 to 1898
James Murray (British Army officer, born 1721), governed Quebec from 1760 to 1766
John Murray, 4th Earl of Dunmore (1730–1809), Scottish peer and colonial governor in the American colonies
Johnston Murray (1902–1974), 14th Governor of Oklahoma, 1951–1955
William H. Murray, 9th Governor of Oklahoma, 1931–1935

See also
Pendleton Murrah, 10th Governor of Texas, 1863–1865